The 2018 National Women's Soccer League season was the sixth season of the National Women's Soccer League, the top division of women's soccer in the United States. Including the NWSL's two professional predecessors, Women's Professional Soccer (2009–2011) and the Women's United Soccer Association (2001–2003), it was the twelfth overall season of FIFA and USSF-sanctioned top division women's soccer in the United States. The league is operated by the United States Soccer Federation and receives major financial backing from that body. Further financial backing is provided by the Canadian Soccer Association. Both national federations pay the league salaries of many of their respective national team members in an effort to nurture talent in those nations and take the financial burden off individual clubs.

The off-season brought significant changes, with FC Kansas City and the Boston Breakers ceasing operations, while new club Utah Royals FC joined the league. The 2018 season began on March 24, and ended on September 8. Teams once again played 24 regular-season games this year, with the top four teams making a single-elimination playoff. The North Carolina Courage won the NWSL Shield with 15 more points than second place Thorns. The NWSL Playoffs began on September 15 with the two semifinal matches, which were won by the Thorns and the Courage. The NWSL Championship Game was held on September 22 at Providence Park in Portland. The Courage won 3–0, becoming the first team to win both the NWSL Shield and the NWSL Championship in the same season.

Teams, stadiums, and personnel

Stadiums and locations 

Two teams, the Dash and Reign, do not make their stadiums' entire capacity available for home games, instead restricting ticket sales at a lower level. The full capacities of their venues are included in parentheses and italics.

Personnel and sponsorship 

Note: All of the teams use Nike as their kit manufacturer.

Coaching changes

Competition format 

 Each team will play each team 3 times, for a total of 24 games (12 home and 12 away).
 The four teams at the end of the season with the most points qualify for the playoffs.

League standings

Tiebreakers 

The initial determining factor for a team's position in the standings is most points earned, with three points earned for a win, one point for a draw, and zero points for a loss. If two or more teams tie in point total, when determining rank and playoff qualification and seeding, the NWSL uses the following tiebreaker rules, going down the list until all teams are ranked.

 Head-to-head win–loss record between the teams (or points-per-game if more than two teams).
 Greater goal difference across the entire season (against all teams, not just tied teams).
 Greatest total number of goals scored (against all teams).
 Apply #1–3 to games played on the road.
 Apply #1–3 to games played at home.
 If teams are still equal, ranking will be determined by a coin toss.
NOTE: If two clubs remain tied after another club with the same number of points advances during any step, the tie breaker reverts to step 1 of the two-club format.

Attendance

Average home attendances

Ranked from highest to lowest average attendance.

Updated to games played on September 8, 2018.

Highest attendances 
Regular season

Updated to games played on November 3, 2018.

Statistical leaders

Top scorers

Updated: September 8, 2018

Top assists 

Updated: September 8, 2018

NWSL Playoffs 

The top four teams from the regular season compete for the NWSL Championship. The North Carolina Courage secured the number one seed on August 5, winning their second straight NWSL Shield.

Semi-finals 

*Originally scheduled for September 16 at Sahlen's Stadium in Cary, North Carolina; rescheduled and moved due to Hurricane Florence.

Championship

Individual awards

Monthly awards

Player of the Month

Team of the Month

Weekly awards

Annual awards

References 

 NWSL Statistics

External links 

 
2018
National Women's Soccer League